Radio Tay is a group of two Independent Local Radio stations serving Tayside and northeast Fife in Scotland. Radio Tay is owned and operated by Bauer Radio, based at studios at 6 North Isla Street in Dundee and forms part of Bauer’s Hits Radio and Greatest Hits Radio network of local stations.

Tayside Sound Limited was incorporated on 27 April 1979 to set up a radio station in accordance with the then regulatory body, the Independent Broadcasting Authority. Radio Tay commenced broadcasting on Friday 17 October 1980 from the Angus transmitter near Dundee. A relay transmitter in Perth opened five weeks later.

Originally launched as a simulcast station on AM and FM, Radio Tay split into two distinct radio services on 9 January 1995: Tay FM, playing contemporary hit music and Tay AM, carrying an older selection of classic hits. On 19 January 2015, Tay 3 was launched as a locally-branded service of pop music aimed at 15- to 25-year-olds. These stations broadcast to the Tayside catchment area, with a potential target audience of 391,000 people. As of 2015, Radio Tay attracts a weekly audience of 204,000 listeners across its three services.

Most of Radio Tay's locally-produced programming airs on Tay FM, consisting of 13 hours on weekdays and 4 hours at weekends. Tay 2 produces a Scottish drivetime show on weekdays from its Dundee studios as well as live football commentaries on Saturday afternoons. All three stations also carry local news, sport and traffic bulletins every day. Networked programming is also carried on the three services from sister stations including Radio Clyde in Clydebank and Hits Radio in Manchester.

Notable presenters
David Robertson – former presenter of BBC Reporting Scotland
Bill Torrance – previously presented The Beechgrove Garden and other television programmes
Mark Goodier – previously worked for Radio Tay, prior to his career on BBC Radio 1
Dave Bussey – later presented a weekend programme on BBC Radio 2, once at BBC Radio Lincolnshire
Eddie Mair – former presenter of BBC Radio 4's PM

References

External links
 Radio Tay
 Tay FM
 Tay 2
 Bauer Media – Tay

Bauer Radio
Radio stations in Dundee
Radio stations established in 1980